A Case of Libel is a 1963 novel by the British writer John Bingham. Unlike his usual crime-thrillers, it is a drama about a libel case brought by a woman against a national newspaper headed by a ruthless new editor.

References

Bibliography
 Reilly, John M. Twentieth Century Crime & Mystery Writers. Springer, 2015.

1963 British novels
Novels by John Bingham
Victor Gollancz Ltd books